Sadamichi Maekawa(前川禎通 Maekawa Sadamichi)  is a Japanese researcher, who was born in Nara Prefecture, Japan in 1946. He obtained his B. Sc. (1969), M. Sc. (1971) degrees from Osaka University, and D. Sc. (1975) degree from Tohoku University. He was a research associate (1971–1982) and an associate professor (1982–1988) at Institute for Materials Research, Tohoku University, and a professor (1988–1997) at Faculty of Engineering, Nagoya University, and a professor (1997–2010) at Institute for Materials Research, Tohoku University. After serving as a director of Advanced Science Research Center in Japan Atomic Energy Agency(2010-2018), he became a senior advisor at RIKEN Center for Emergent Matter Science from April 2018.

His main research topics include theory of electronic properties in strongly correlated electron systems, in particular, high-temperature superconductors and orbital physics in transition metal oxides and theory of spintronics.

Professional Experience

Awards 
2018      Highly Cited Researchers2018

2013      Honoris Causa Doctorate of University of Zaragoza, Spain

2012      Honorary Member of the Magnetic Society of Japan

2012      IUPAP Magnetism Award and Néel Medal

2008      the title of Distinguished Professor, Tohoku University

2008      Fellow of the American Physical Society

2005      the title of Honda Professor, Tohoku University

2003      Magnetics Society of Japan Award

2001      Humboldt Award (Germany)

1999      Fellow of Institute of Physics (UK)

References 

Fellows of the American Physical Society
American Physical Society
Japanese physicists
Living people
Date of death missing
Year of birth missing (living people)